David Graves may refer to:

 David Graves (politician) (born 1947), member of the Georgia House of Representatives
 David Graves (character), a DC Comics supervillain
 David Graves (bishop) (born 1958), United Methodist bishop
 David W. Graves (born 1953), American educator and theologian
 David  Bibb Graves (1873–1942), governor of Alabama